Urduja is a 2008 animated film adaptation of the legend of the warrior princess Urduja of Pangasinan. It was the first of two locally produced (in the Philippines) animated films set for release in 2008. The other, Dayo, was released as an entry for the 2008 Metro Manila Film Festival. 

The film was created by an all-Filipino group of animators and made using the traditional (hand-drawn) animation process. It also features an all-Filipino cast of voice actors. Urduja was released on June 18, 2008. The running time of the movie is within exactly 100 minutes.

Plot
Set in the 13th century, the film is a fictionalized tale of Princess Urduja, legendary warrior princess of Pangasinan.

As the only daughter of Lakanpati, chieftain of the Tawilisi tribe of Northern Luzon, Urduja grew up as a warrior with the ability and willingness to defend her people from their rival tribe, the Badjaos. Lakanpati's age and failing health gave rise to the urgency of finding a man for the princess to marry and who will inevitably lead the tribe as the new chieftain.

The man Lakanpati considers most eligible to become Urduja's husband is Simakwel, a Tawilisi warrior but whom the princess dislikes. Oblivious of Simakwel's ambitious and scheming ways, Lakanpati tries his best to convince Urduja to marry him. However, Urduja meets Limhang, a Chinese pirate, who lands on the Tawilisi shore after he flees from the wrath of the ruthlessly greedy Wang. Urduja immediately falls in love with the stranger Limhang,  which worries Lakanpati and drives Simakwel into madness. Afraid of losing both the crown and Urduja, Simakwel does everything to drive Limhang away from his dream. Eventually, Limhang's good deeds and genuine kindness win the respect and trust of the Taliwisi tribe.

Wang soon finds Limhang, who surrenders voluntarily to Wang in assurance that he will not attack Tawilisi. In the end, Wang still orders his men to attack the tribe. Urduja and her people bravely defend the tribe from the forces of Wang. Limhang escapes from his captors and with the aid of the Badjaos sends the invaders fleeing.

In the end, Daisuke, Mayumi and Kukut left Limhang, who decided to stay with his love, but not without another surprise from Tarsir, which the latter threw a snake on Kukut.

Cast
Regine Velasquez as Princess Urduja, the titular character and Lakanpati's daughter. Singer Regine Velasquez was handpicked by Antonio Tuviera to play the title role.
Cesar Montano as Limhang, the Chinese pirate who landed on the Tawalisi shore and Princess Urduja's love interest.
Eddie Garcia as Lakanpati, Chief of the Tawilisi tribe and Princess Urduja's father.
Jay Manalo as Simakwel, Princess Urduja's fiancé.
Johnny Delgado as Wang, Limhang's nemesis.
Ruby Rodriguez as Mayumi, Princess Urduja's best friend.
Epi Quizon as Daisuke, Limhang's Japanese samurai best friend and right-hand man. Mayumi has a crush on him.
Michael V.  as Kukut, Limhang's pet mouse.
Allan K.  as Tarsir, Princess Urduja's pet tarsier.
Bj Forbes as Botyok, the boy Simakwel takes as hostage from the Badjao tribe.

References

External links
 
 
 Urduja on GMA News
  and 

2008 films
2008 animated films
Philippine animated films